Phillipps is both a given name and an English surname. Notable people with the name include:

"Phillipps" has also been a shortened version of Philippson, a German surname especially prevalent amongst German Jews and Dutch Jews.

People with the given name Phillipps:

 Ambrose Lisle March Phillipps De Lisle (1809–1878), founder of a Trappist abbey
 John Phillipps Kenyon (1927–1996), British historian

People with the surname Phillipps:

 Anthea Phillipps (born 1956), British botanist
 Everard Aloysius Lisle Phillipps (1835–1857), English recipient of the Victoria Cross
 Jack Phillipps (1898-1977), New Zealand cricket administrator
 Martin Phillipps (born 1963), New Zealand singer/songwriter of The Chills
 Roy Phillipps (1892–1941), Australian fighter ace
 Thomas Phillipps (1792–1872), English antiquary and book collector
 Vivian Phillipps (Henry Vivian Phillipps, 1870–1955), British teacher, lawyer and Liberal politician
 William Herbert Phillipps (1847–1935), South Australian businessman and philanthropist
 William J. Phillipps (1893–1967), New Zealand ichthyologist

See also
 Halliwell-Phillipps
 Phillippe
 Philips (surname)
 Philipps (disambiguation)
 Phillips (disambiguation)

English-language surnames
English masculine given names
Patronymic surnames
Surnames from given names